Benedict Fitzgerald (born 1949) is an American screenwriter who co-wrote the screenplay for 2004 film The Passion of the Christ with its director, Mel Gibson. His other writing credits include a television screenplay of Moby-Dick in 1998 (uncredited) and Wise Blood in 1979. He is a consulting producer on the Paramount+ television series Evil.

Early life
Benedict is the son of Sally and poet/critic Robert Fitzgerald. When he was a child, one of his babysitters was novelist Flannery O'Connor.

Lawsuit
On February 11, 2008, Benedict Fitzgerald filed a lawsuit against Mel Gibson and the production company Icon Productions, alleging the unfair deprivation of compensation and deception on the overall expense of the film production budget after the blockbuster box office success of the film The Passion of the Christ, including, but not limited to, "fraud, breach of contract & unjust enrichment" seeking unspecified damages. According to his lawsuit, Fitzgerald says he "accepted a salary substantially less than what he would have taken had he known the true budget for the film," agreeing to an undisclosed "relatively small salary," a $75,000 production bonus, another $75,000 if the movie broke even, and then five percent of revenues. Fitzgerald received a loan of $200,000 from Gibson in December 2003 backed by his share of the film's future profits as collateral.

In May 2009, Gibson agreed to an undisclosed settlement with Fitzgerald. Details of the settlement, agreed at Los Angeles Superior Court, were not released. Gibson's representatives have not commented on the settlement.

Filmography

Film
Wise Blood (1979)
The Passion of the Christ (2004)
Mary Mother of Christ (TBA)
A Good Man Is Hard to Find (TBA)

Television
Heart of Darkness (1993)
Zelda (1993)
In Cold Blood (1996)
Moby Dick (1998) (uncredited)
 Evil (2020) (consulting producer)

References

External links
 
 Interview with Benedict Fitzgerald Honolulu Star-Bulletin February 22, 2004

1949 births
American male screenwriters
Living people